Salvatore Romano (born 15 October 1967) is a retired Italian football striker.

While at FC Aarau he was part of the side that won the Swiss national title in 1992–93.

References

1967 births
Living people
Italian footballers
FC Zürich players
FC Wettingen players
FC Aarau players
FC Lausanne-Sport players
FC Wohlen players
Association football forwards